Çukurpinar (Sazara) is a village in the Balkans part of Turkey covered with extensive forests and a population of 407 in 2007.

Known since Roman times the village is today located near the modern border with Bulgaria and is the location of a migrant hostel.
The village economy of agriculture and animal husbandry includes ravioli and dry beans. The village is also home to a great cave complex, open to visitors for much of the year. The cave has extensive stalactites and stalagmites as well as 15 kinds of bats. The limestone topography allows for Marble quarrying within the village limits.
  
The village has water and sewage, paved roads, a school, post office and medical center.

References

Kırklareli
Villages in Kırklareli Province